Yohan Georges Francis Yvon Le Bourhis (born 9 March 2000) is a Canadian professional soccer player who plays as a centre-back.

Club career

Early career
Le Bourhis grew up in Montreal, Quebec, and began playing soccer at age six with local club CS Mont-Royal Outremont.

Montreal Impact
Le Bourhis joined the academy of Major League Soccer side Montreal Impact in 2015, where he began playing for the U15/U16 team.

Blainville
In July 2019, Le Bourhis left the Impact and signed with PLSQ side Blainville. He made his senior debut on 14 July in a 3–1 win over St-Hubert. He made a total of three appearances for Blainville that season.

Valour FC
On 9 August 2019, Le Bourhis signed his first professional contract with Canadian Premier League side Valour FC. He made his debut the following day as a starter in a 2–0 win over York9. On 15 January 2021, Valour announced that Le Bourhis would not return for the 2021 season.

International career
In 2015, Le Bourhis received his first national team call-up to the Canadian U-15 team for a friendly tournament. In April 2016, he received his first call-up to the Canadian U-17 team for a training camp, and participated in several more throughout 2016 and 2017 in the lead-up to the 2017 CONCACAF U-17 Championship. At that tournament, Le Bourhis started in two of Canada's three matches.

In 2018, Le Bourhis was called up to the Canadian U-20 team ahead of the 2018 CONCACAF U-20 Championship, where he started in three of Canada's five matches.

Le Bourhis was named to the Canadian U-23 provisional roster for the 2020 CONCACAF Men's Olympic Qualifying Championship on February 26, 2020.

References

External links

2000 births
Living people
Association football defenders
Canadian soccer players
Soccer players from Montreal
CF Montréal players
Valour FC players
Première ligue de soccer du Québec players
Canadian Premier League players
Canada men's youth international soccer players
A.S. Blainville players
CS Mont-Royal Outremont players